Sinclair Rogers II (December 15, 1956 – April 19, 2020) was an American Christian pastor who was part of the ex-gay movement. In the late 1980s, Rogers was a President of Exodus International, and became one of the earliest personalities associated with the ex-gay movement.  He wrote a life-story entitled "The Man in the Mirror," which was published in pamphlet form by Last Days Ministries.

Life and career 
As a young man, Rogers was involved in the gay community and had physical relationships with men. He later identified as transgender, living as a woman for a year and a half and beginning the process of arranging to have sex-change surgery. He credited his conversion to Christianity for igniting personal growth and a new-found security in gender identity which enabled a shift in his sexuality to heterosexual.  He stated in his personal story, "My goal was not to be straight--it was God". In 1982, he began to identify as heterosexual, married a woman he met in a Bible-study group  and they raised a family together.

In 1988, Rogers then 30, a married father, living in Florida, self-describing as a former homosexual and former transgender, told a reporter for the Chicago Sun-Times that the ex-gay movement was not anti-gay, "If you want to stay gay, that's your business,... But the bottom line is, you have a choice to overcome it. You can change." "The goal is God--not going straight. Straight people don't go to Heaven, redeemed people do."

During Rogers' involvement in the mid to late 1980s, Exodus International had offices on five continents and declared that "all homosexual relationships are sinful." In conducting a speaking tour in 2008 Rogers’ message included, "Homosexuality is out of tune with religion; it is not what God planned for human sexuality." Writing in The Gay & Lesbian Review Worldwide, gay rights advocate Wayne Besen argued that during the AIDS epidemic "some men were literally scared straight - or at least into making the futile attempt," bringing a degree of momentary success to Exodus International.

In 2016, The Daily Beast reported that Rogers's ministry had moved away from the ex-gay message many years earlier. Sy’s later speaking ministry exceeded homosexual issues, often referencing sex in the larger context of God and culture.

In Singapore, Rogers helped to set up Choices, the ex-gay ministry at Church of Our Saviour. He also preached regularly at City Harvest Church, Faith Community Baptist Church and Heart of God Church.

Rogers is portrayed in the 1993 documentary One Nation Under God. From 2012, he was a Teaching Pastor with the multi-campus LIFE Church & College in Auckland, New Zealand.

Rogers died in Winter Park, Florida on April 19, 2020, from cancer. He was survived by his wife of 38 years, Karen Ann Campbell, their daughter and two grandchildren.

References

External links

 

American Christian clergy
1956 births
2020 deaths
American activists
Ex-gay movement
People who detransitioned